Andrew Maurice Gold (August 2, 1951 – June 3, 2011) was an American multi-instrumentalist, singer, songwriter, and record producer who influenced much of the Los Angeles-dominated pop/soft rock sound in the 1970s. Gold played on scores of records by other artists, most notably Linda Ronstadt, and had his own success with the U.S. top 40 hits "Lonely Boy" (1977) and "Thank You for Being a Friend" (1978), as well as the UK top five hit "Never Let Her Slip Away" (1978). In the 1980s, he had further international chart success as one half of Wax, a collaboration with 10cc's Graham Gouldman.

During the 1990s, Gold produced, composed, performed on and wrote tracks for films, commercials, and television soundtracks, such as "Final Frontier", the theme of the sitcom Mad About You. Some of his older works later experienced newfound popularity: "Thank You for Being a Friend" was used as the opening theme for The Golden Girls, and the children's novelty song "Spooky, Scary Skeletons" (1996) became an Internet meme in the 2010s. In 1997, Gold released a tribute to 1960s psychedelic music, Greetings from Planet Love, issued under the pseudonym "the Fraternal Order of the All". He died in 2011 at age 59 from heart failure.

Early life
Gold was born on August 2, 1951, in Burbank, California, and eventually followed his parents into show business. His mother was singer Marni Nixon, who provided the singing voice for numerous actresses, notably Natalie Wood in West Side Story, Deborah Kerr in The King and I, and Audrey Hepburn in My Fair Lady; his father was Ernest Gold, an Austrian-born composer who won an Academy Award for his score for the movie Exodus. He had two younger sisters.

Gold began writing songs at the age of 13. While in school in the United Kingdom for one year, the 16-year-old Gold scored his first recording contract on the strength of a selection of demos he submitted to Polydor Records' London office. That contract resulted in the single "Of All the Little Girls", which was recorded with his friend and collaborator Charlie Villiers, and released in 1967 under the name Villiers and Gold.

Career

1970s
By the early 1970s, Gold was working full-time as a musician, songwriter and record producer. He was a member of the Los Angeles band Bryndle, alongside Kenny Edwards, Wendy Waldman and Karla Bonoff, releasing the single "Woke Up This Morning" in 1970. He played a major role as multi-instrumentalist and arranger for Linda Ronstadt's breakthrough album, 1974's Heart Like a Wheel, and her next two albums. After Ronstadt's Hasten Down the Wind, Gold began a career as a solo artist. Among other accomplishments, he played the majority of instruments on "You're No Good", Ronstadt's only No. 1 single on the Billboard Hot 100, and on "When Will I Be Loved", "(Love Is Like a) Heat Wave", and many other hits. He was in her band from 1973 until 1977, and then sporadically throughout the 1980s and 1990s, performing at some of her concerts.

In 1975, Gold debuted as a solo artist, with the album Andrew Gold, and played most of the instruments on Art Garfunkel's solo hit "I Only Have Eyes For You" (which was a major hit in the United Kingdom, where it topped the UK Singles Chart), as well as several other cuts on Garfunkel's album Breakaway.

Gold's second studio album, What's Wrong with This Picture?, was released in 1976 and featured the hit single "Lonely Boy", which reached No. 7 on the Billboard Hot 100 in June 1977.

In 1977, Gold also played guitar on two cuts of Eric Carmen's album Boats Against the Current, including "She Did It", a No. 23 hit that year.

Although "Lonely Boy" was the bigger radio hit in the States, the single "Thank You for Being a Friend" from Gold's third album, All This and Heaven Too, peaked at No. 25 in 1978, later gaining popularity as the theme song for The Golden Girls, performed by Cindy Fee.

Gold's biggest hit in the United Kingdom was "Never Let Her Slip Away", which peaked at number five on the UK Singles Chart on two occasions, firstly by Gold himself in 1978 and again by dance-pop group Undercover in 1992. Freddie Mercury, a friend of Gold's, was an uncredited background singer.

Gold also toured with the Eagles, worked in the studio and toured with Ronstadt and Jackson Browne, recorded and toured with James Taylor, and was second engineer on part of Joni Mitchell's album Blue.

1980s
Gold played on Cher's hit 1989 album Heart of Stone and, during the early '90s, wrote and composed hits for Trisha Yearwood as well as Wynonna Judd, for whom he co-wrote the No. 1 single "I Saw The Light" with Lisa Angelle. (Later, Gold would produce Angelle on her own album, which featured a number of songs on whose authorship and composition they collaborated.) He also produced singles for Vince Gill, wrote and produced tracks for Celine Dion, and arranged a cover of the Everly Brothers' hit "All I Have to Do Is Dream" that was sung by stars Jeff Bridges and Karen Allen in the 1984 science-fiction film Starman.

Wax

In 1981, Gold produced, co-wrote, sang and played on three 10cc tracks that appeared on the hit-making pop-rock band's 1981 album Ten Out of 10. Subsequently, Eric Stewart and Graham Gouldman of 10cc invited Gold to become a member of the group. Although he had worked with them in the studio, business conflicts prevented him from joining their ranks.

In late 1983, 10cc broke up, and in the aftermath, Gold and Gouldman formed Wax. Wax recorded and toured for five years. They enjoyed international success, particularly in the UK, where the duo had several hits including "Right Between the Eyes" and their biggest hit, "Bridge to Your Heart". Wax broke up as a recording and touring entity in 1989, but Gold and Gouldman continued to write and record together whenever possible.

1990s
In the 1990s, Gold once again joined forces with ex-bandmates Karla Bonoff, Wendy Waldman and Kenny Edwards to re-form Bryndle and release their first full-length album, Bryndle.

In 1996, Gold left Bryndle and released the children's Halloween-oriented novelty album Halloween Howls, featuring the track "Spooky Scary Skeletons". The same year, he released the solo album ....Since 1951, and produced Stephen Bishop's Blue Guitar album. Thereafter, he recorded the psychedelic '60s tribute album Greetings from Planet Love under the pseudonym "The Fraternal Order of the All," releasing it on his own record label, "QBrain Records." This album was a multi-tracked solo affair with Gold essentially playing all of the instruments and singing all of the vocals on original songs in the style of Gold's favorite 1960s bands such as The Beatles, The Byrds and The Beach Boys.

He produced, composed, and/or wrote tracks for numerous films, such as the comedy Rectuma from director Mark Pirro, and contributed songs to many television soundtracks and commercials. Among his more high-profile gigs, he sang "Final Frontier," the theme song for the television sitcom Mad About You. In a remarkable turn of events, his rendition of the song was used as the wake-up call for the Mars Pathfinder space probe in 1996.

Gold also produced seven albums for Japanese singer-songwriter Eikichi Yazawa.

2000s
In 2000, Gold compiled a Wax rarities album, Bikini Wax, as well as recording and releasing a new solo album The Spence Manor Suite; this last was followed in 2002 by another solo collection, Intermission. In the early 2000s, he formed a Byrds tribute band, Byrds of a Feather, which performed in the Los Angeles area.

He appeared in a 2006 concert with the classic rock group America, and singer-songwriter Stephen Bishop, and the performance was later released as a DVD titled America And Friends – Live at the Ventura Theater. The show featured Gold performing "Thank You for Being a Friend," "Final Frontier," "Bridge to Your Heart" and "Lonely Boy," as well as accompanying America and Bishop on guitar and vocals. Gold had earlier produced America's Holiday Harmony Christmas album back in 2002, wherein he also played most of the instruments and co-wrote the track "Christmas in California."

Legacy
In the early 2010s, Gold's song "Spooky Scary Skeletons" became the subject of Halloween-related Internet memes through its popularity on 4chan's video games board. Within a few years, the song turned into a viral phenomenon, with numerous highly viewed remixes and dance tutorials for it being posted on YouTube; it was described by New York magazine in 2019 as the "Internet's Halloween anthem". The YouTuber Dave Wave released a very popular remix of the song that was later published on Spotify by the Craft Recordings. The song also became highly popular on the social media site TikTok, with videos including it receiving several hundred million views. By 2019, the popularity of "Spooky Scary Skeletons" had inspired a deluxe digital release of Halloween Howls. This version of the album included the addition of two extended electronic dance remixes of "Spooky Scary Skeletons."

In 2020, an early version of Gold's song "Savannah" was issued as a digital single. It was followed by Something New: Unreleased Gold – a posthumous compilation album of previously unavailable tracks, including some demos – in vinyl, CD and digital formats, along with two digital singles from the album: the title song and "Come Down to Me."

Personal life and death
Gold's first marriage was to Vanessa Gold, with whom he had three daughters, Emily, Victoria and Olivia.

In the early 1980s, Gold was engaged to singer Nicolette Larson; this ended shortly after the completion of Larson's 1982 album All Dressed Up and No Place to Go, which Gold produced.

He later married Leslie Kogan who manages his musical legacy.

Although Gold put personal references in the lyrics to "Lonely Boy" (including his year of birth), he said in an interview with author Spencer Leigh that the song was not autobiographical: "Maybe it was a mistake to do that, but I simply put in those details because it was convenient. I hadn't been a lonely boy at all – I'd had a very happy childhood."

Gold was diagnosed with kidney cancer and responded well to treatment. However, on June 3, 2011, he died in his sleep from heart failure at age 59 in Los Angeles.

Discography

Albums

Studio albums

Compilations
 1978: An Interview with Andrew Gold (promo-only interview & music LP)
 1991: Where the Heart Is: The Commercials 1988–1991
 1997: Thank You for Being a Friend: The Best of Andrew Gold
 1998: Leftovers
 2011: The Essential Collection
 2018: An Introduction to: Andrew Gold
 2019: Complete Albums 1975–1980 (Digital)
 2019: Lonely Boy: The Greatest Hits (Digital)
 2019: Halloween Howls: Fun & Scary Music (Deluxe Edition Digital)
 2020: Something New: Unreleased Gold
 2021: Halloween Howls: Fun & Scary Music (Vinyl)

Live albums and EPs
 2005: Rhino Hi-Five: Andrew Gold
 2007: Andrew Gold – Live at the Ventura Theater (Digital EP)
 2015: The Late Show – Live 1978
 2019: Merry Christmas: Thank You for Being a Friend (Digital EP)
 2020: Something New: The Solo Demos (Digital EP)

With Wax

 1986: Magnetic Heaven
 1987: American English
 1989: A Hundred Thousand in Fresh Notes
 1998: Common Knowledge.com

With Bryndle

 1995: Bryndle
 2002: House of Silence

With America and Stephen Bishop
 2006: America & Friends – Live at the Ventura Theater

Box sets
 2013: Andrew Gold + What's Wrong with This Picture + All This and Heaven Too + Whirlwind...Plus
 2020: Lonely Boy: The Asylum Years Anthology

Singles and EPs

Songs

Cuts and covers

References

External links
 Official website
 July 2011 Dublin City FM Radio Special
 Andrew Gold and Graham Gouldman songs at Harvey Lisberg

1951 births
2011 deaths
American male singer-songwriters
American rock songwriters
Record producers from California
American soft rock musicians
Musicians from Burbank, California
Singer-songwriters from California
Asylum Records artists
American people of Austrian descent
American people of Austrian-Jewish descent
American expatriates in England
Contestants on American game shows